Damian Kallabis (born 10 June 1973 in Gliwice, Poland) is a retired German runner who specialized in the 3000 metres steeplechase.

In 1997 his personal best time was 8:37.35 minutes. The next year he sensationally won the European Championships, lowering his personal best time to 8:13.10 minutes. He then won the steeplechase event at the 1998 IAAF World Cup.

In August 1999 he ran in 8:09.48 minutes in Zurich, beating the old German record of Hagen Melzer. This German record still stands. He finished fourth at the World Championships the same year, and fifteenth at the 2000 Summer Olympics.

He became German steeplechase champion in 1998 and 2000, representing the team SCC Berlin. He later switched team to VfB Stuttgart.

References

External links
 
 
 

1973 births
Living people
German male long-distance runners
German male steeplechase runners
Athletes (track and field) at the 2000 Summer Olympics
Olympic athletes of Germany
European Athletics Championships medalists